The Finland women's national volleyball team represents Finland in international women's volleyball competitions and friendly matches.

Results

European Championship

Summer Universiade

European Volleyball League
 2017 — 2nd place 
 2018 — 4th place
 2019 — 7th place

References

External links
 Finland Volleyball Federation
CEV – Team Information

National women's volleyball teams
Volleyball
Volleyball in Finland